In the Shade of Trees is a 2011 Vietnamese computer-animated comedy-adventure film produced by Colory Animation Studio.


Cast
 Đoàn Trần Anh Tú as Mouse
 Đỗ Thị Minh Thư as Frog

External links
 

Vietnamese children's films
2010s children's comedy films
2011 animated films
2011 films
V
Vietnamese computer-animated films
Vietnamese animated films
2011 3D films
3D animated films
2010s children's animated films
2011 comedy films